Bilashi is a historical village located in Sangli district, Maharashtra in India. This village is situated on the bank of River Warna.

It is well known place for its structure of square shape. The Village has a canal to the north whereas a river in south. It is well connected with road to Taluka Shirala (17 km) in east side, to the west is Ratnagiri (approx. 92 km), Kolhapur (approx. 55 km), or Karad (via Shedgewadi).

The Chandoli National Park and Chandoli Dam are approx. 35 km from here.

Villages in Sangli district